Aman Singh is a Canadian politician who has represented the electoral district of Richmond-Queensborough in the Legislative Assembly of British Columbia since 2020, as a member of the British Columbia New Democratic Party. He is the first turban-wearing Sikh to be elected Member of the Legislative Assembly in BC.

Biography
Born in Sultanpur Lodhi, Punjab, India, Singh moved to Hong Kong at the age of one with his family, living there until age 18. He has some knowledge of Cantonese, and can also speak Hindi and Punjabi alongside English. He attended University of California, Berkeley, where he studied physics and anthropology. He went on to receive a law degree from University of Victoria, and operated his own law practice specializing in human and civil rights law. He had lived in Richmond, British Columbia for two decades, before moving to the Delta neighbourhood of Sunshine Hills.

Singh contested the new riding of Richmond-Queensborough in the 2017 provincial election as a candidate for the British Columbia New Democratic Party; he lost to Liberal candidate Jas Johal by 134 votes. The two faced off again in the 2020 provincial election, with Singh defeating Johal this time to win the seat. On December 7, 2022 he was appointed Parliamentary Secretary for Environment by Premier David Eby.

Singh has a daughter with wife Katrina. He was diagnosed with colon cancer in August 2021, and underwent radiation, chemotherapy and surgery to remove the tumour.

Electoral record

References

Living people
Year of birth missing (living people)
21st-century Canadian politicians
British Columbia New Democratic Party MLAs
Canadian Sikhs
People from Richmond, British Columbia
Canadian politicians of Punjabi descent
University of Victoria Faculty of Law alumni
Lawyers in British Columbia
Hong Kong people of Punjabi descent